Skylake is the codename used by Intel for a processor microarchitecture that was launched in August 2015 succeeding the Broadwell microarchitecture. Skylake is a microarchitecture redesign using the same 14 nm manufacturing process technology as its predecessor, serving as a tock in Intel's tick–tock manufacturing and design model. According to Intel, the redesign brings greater CPU and GPU performance and reduced power consumption. Skylake CPUs share their microarchitecture with Kaby Lake, Coffee Lake, Cannon Lake, Whiskey Lake, and Comet Lake CPUs.

Skylake is the last Intel platform on which Windows earlier than Windows 10 will be officially supported by Microsoft, although enthusiast-created modifications exist that allow Windows 8.1 and earlier to continue to receive Windows Updates on later platforms.

Some of the processors based on the Skylake microarchitecture are marketed as 6th-generation Core.

Intel officially declared end of life and discontinued Skylake LGA 1151 CPUs on March 4, 2019.

Development history 
Skylake's development, as with previous processors such as Banias, Dothan, Conroe, Sandy Bridge, and Ivy Bridge, was primarily undertaken by Intel Israel at its engineering research center in Haifa, Israel. The final design was largely an evolution of Haswell, with minor improvements to performance and several power-saving features being added. A major priority of Skylake's design was to design a microarchitecture for envelopes as low as 4.5W to embed within tablet computers and notebooks in addition to higher-power desktop computers and servers.

In September 2014, Intel announced the Skylake microarchitecture at the Intel Developer Forum in San Francisco, and that volume shipments of Skylake CPUs were scheduled for the second half of 2015.  The Skylake development platform was announced to be available in Q1 2015.  During the announcement, Intel also demonstrated two computers with desktop and mobile Skylake prototypes: the first was a desktop testbed system, running the latest version of 3DMark, while the second computer was a fully functional laptop, playing 4K video.

An initial batch of Skylake CPU models (6600K and 6700K) was announced for immediate availability during the Gamescom on August 5, 2015, unusually soon after the release of its predecessor, Broadwell, which had suffered from launch delays. Intel acknowledged in 2014 that moving from 22 nm (Haswell) to 14 nm (Broadwell) had been its most difficult process to develop yet, causing Broadwell's planned launch to slip by several months; yet, the 14 nm production was back on track and in full production as of Q3 2014. Industry observers had initially believed that the issues affecting Broadwell would also cause Skylake to slip to 2016, but Intel was able to bring forward Skylake's release and shorten Broadwell's release cycle instead. As a result, the Broadwell architecture had an unusually short run.

Overclocking of unsupported processors 
Officially Intel supported overclocking of only the K and X versions of Skylake processors. However, it was later discovered that other non-K chips could be overclocked by modifying the base clock value – a process made feasible by the base clock applying only to the CPU, RAM, and integrated graphics on Skylake. Through beta UEFI firmware updates, some motherboard vendors, such as ASRock (which prominently promoted it under the name Sky OC) allowed the base clock to be modified in this manner.

When overclocking unsupported processors using these UEFI firmware updates, several issues arise:
C-states are disabled, therefore the CPU will constantly run at its highest frequency and voltage
Turbo-boost is disabled
Integrated graphics are disabled
AVX2 instruction performance is poor, approximately 4-5 times slower due to the upper 128-bit half of the execution units and data buses not being taken out of their power saving states
CPU core temperature readings are incorrect
These issues are partly caused by the power management of the processor needing to be disabled for base clock overclocking to work.

In February 2016, however, an ASRock firmware update removed the feature. On February 9, 2016, Intel announced that it would no longer allow such overclocking of non-K processors, and that it had issued a CPU microcode update that removes the function. In April 2016, ASRock started selling motherboards that allow overclocking of unsupported CPUs using an external clock generator.

Operating system support 
In January 2016, Microsoft announced that it would end support of Windows 7 and Windows 8.1 on Skylake processors effective July 17, 2017; after this date, only the most critical updates for the two operating systems would be released for Skylake users if they have been judged not to affect the reliability of the OS on older hardware, and Windows 10 would be the only Microsoft Windows platform officially supported on Skylake, as well as all future Intel CPU microarchitectures beginning with Skylake's successor Kaby Lake. Terry Myerson stated that Microsoft had to make a large investment in order to reliably support Skylake on older versions of Windows, and that future generations of processors would require further investments. Microsoft also stated that due to the age of the platform, it would be challenging for newer hardware, firmware, and device driver combinations to properly run under Windows 7.

On March 18, 2016, in response to criticism over the move, primarily from enterprise customers, Microsoft announced revisions to the support policy, changing the cutoff for support and non-critical updates to July 17, 2018 and stating that Skylake users would receive all critical security updates for Windows 7 and 8.1 through the end of extended support. In August 2016, citing "a strong partnership with our OEM partners and Intel", Microsoft stated that it would continue to fully support 7 and 8.1 on Skylake through the end of their respective lifecycles. In addition, an enthusiast-created modification was released that disabled the Windows Update check and allowed Windows 8.1 and earlier to continue to be updated on this and later platforms.

As of Linux kernel 4.10, Skylake mobile power management is supported with most Package C states supported seeing some use. Linux 4.11 enables Frame-Buffer Compression for the integrated graphics chipset by default, which lowers power consumption.

Skylake is fully supported on OpenBSD 6.2 and later, including accelerated graphics.

For Windows 11, only the high-end Skylake-X processors are officially listed as compatible. All other Skylake processors are not officially supported due to security concerns. However, it is still possible to manually upgrade using an ISO image (as Windows 10 users on those processors won't be offered to upgrade to Windows 11 via Windows Update), or perform a clean installation as long as the system has Trusted Platform Module (TPM) 2.0 enabled, but the user must accept that they will not be entitled to receive updates, and that damage caused by using Windows 11 on an unsupported configuration are not covered by the manufacturer's warranty.

Features 

Like its predecessor, Broadwell, Skylake is available in five variants, identified by the suffixes S (SKL-S), X (SKL-X), H (SKL-H), U (SKL-U), and Y (SKL-Y). SKL-S and SKL-X contain overclockable K and X variants with unlocked multipliers.  The H, U and Y variants are manufactured in ball grid array (BGA) packaging, while the S and X variants are manufactured in land grid array (LGA) packaging using a new socket, LGA 1151 (LGA 2066 for Skylake X). Skylake is used in conjunction with Intel 100 Series chipsets, also known as Sunrise Point.

The major changes between the Haswell and Skylake architectures include the removal of the fully integrated voltage regulator (FIVR) introduced with Haswell. On the variants that will use a discrete Platform Controller Hub (PCH), Direct Media Interface (DMI) 2.0 is replaced by DMI 3.0, which allows speeds of up to 8 GT/s.

Skylake's U and Y variants support one DIMM slot per channel, while H and S variants support two DIMM slots per channel.  Skylake's launch and sales lifespan occur at the same time as the ongoing SDRAM market transition, with DDR3 SDRAM memory gradually being replaced by DDR4 memory. Rather than working exclusively with DDR4, the Skylake microarchitecture remains backward compatible by interoperating with both types of memory. Accompanying the microarchitecture's support for both memory standards, a new SO-DIMM type capable of carrying either DDR3 or DDR4 memory chips, called UniDIMM, was also announced.

Skylake's few P variants have a reduced on-die graphics unit (12 execution units enabled instead of 24 execution units) over their direct counterparts; see the table below. In contrast, with Ivy Bridge CPUs the P suffix was used for CPUs with completely disabled on-die video chipset.

Other enhancements include Thunderbolt 3.0, SATA Express, Iris Pro graphics with Direct3D feature level 12_1  with up to 128 MB of L4 eDRAM cache on certain SKUs.  The Skylake line of processors retires VGA support, while supporting up to five monitors connected via HDMI 1.4, DisplayPort 1.2 or Embedded DisplayPort (eDP) interfaces. HDMI 2.0 (4K@60 Hz) is only supported on motherboards equipped with Intel's Alpine Ridge Thunderbolt controller.

The Skylake instruction set changes include Intel MPX (Memory Protection Extensions) and Intel SGX (Software Guard Extensions). Future Xeon variants will also have Advanced Vector Extensions 3.2 (AVX-512F).

Skylake-based laptops were predicted to use wireless technology called Rezence for charging, and other wireless technologies for communication with peripherals. Many major PC vendors agreed to use this technology in Skylake-based laptops; however, no laptops were released with the technology as of 2019.

The integrated GPU of Skylake's S variant supports on Windows DirectX 12 Feature Level 12_1, OpenGL 4.6 with latest Windows 10 driver update (OpenGL 4.5 on Linux) and OpenCL 3.0 standards. The Quick Sync video engine now includes support for VP9 (GPU accelerated decode only), VP8 and HEVC (hardware accelerated 8-bit encode/decode and GPU accelerated 10-bit decode), and supports for resolutions up to 40962048.

Intel also released unlocked (capable of overclocking) mobile Skylake CPUs.

Unlike previous generations, Skylake-based Xeon E3 no longer works with a desktop chipset that supports the same socket, and requires either the C232 or the C236 chipset to operate.

Known issues 
Short loops with a specific combination of instruction use may cause unpredictable system behavior on CPUs with hyperthreading. A microcode update was issued to fix the issue.

Skylake is vulnerable to Spectre attacks.
In fact, it is more vulnerable than other processors because it uses indirect branch speculation not just on indirect branches but also when the return prediction stack underflows.

The latency for the spinlock  instruction has been increased dramatically (from the usual 10 cycles to 141 cycles in Skylake), which can cause performance issues with older programs or libraries using pause instructions. Intel documents the increased latency as a feature that improves power efficiency.

Architecture changes compared to Broadwell microarchitecture

CPU 
 Improved front-end, deeper out-of-order buffers, improved execution units, more execution units (third vector integer ALU(VALU)) for five ALUs in total, more load/store bandwidth, improved hyper-threading (wider retirement), speedup of AES-GCM and AES-CBC by 17% and 33% accordingly.
 Up to four cores as the default mainstream configuration and up to 18 cores for X-series
AVX-512: F, CD, VL, BW, and DQ for some future Xeon variants, but not Xeon E3
 Intel MPX (Memory Protection Extensions)
 Intel SGX (Software Guard Extensions)
 Intel Speed Shift
Larger Re-order buffer (224 entries, up from 192)
 L1 cache size unchanged at 32 KB instruction and 32 KB data cache per core.
L2 cache was changed from 8-way to 4-way set associative
Voltage regulator module (FIVR) is moved back to the motherboard
Enhancements of Intel Processor Trace: fine grained timing through CYC packets (cycle-accurate mode) and support for IP (Instruction Pointer) address filtering.
 64 to 128 MB L4 eDRAM cache on certain SKUs

GPU 
 Skylake's integrated Gen9 GPU supports Direct3D 12 at the feature level 12_1
 Full fixed function HEVC Main/8bit encoding/decoding acceleration. Hybrid/Partial HEVC Main10/10bit decoding acceleration. JPEG encoding acceleration for resolutions up to 16,000×16,000 pixels. Partial VP9 encoding/decoding acceleration.

I/O 
 LGA 1151 socket for mainstream desktop processors and LGA 2066 socket for enthusiast gaming/workstation X-series processors
 100-series chipset (Sunrise Point)
 X-series uses X299-series chipset
DMI 3.0 (From DMI 2.0)
 Support for both DDR3L SDRAM and DDR4 SDRAM in mainstream variants, using custom UniDIMM SO-DIMM form factor with up to 64 GB of RAM on LGA 1151 variants. Usual DDR3 memory is also supported by certain motherboard vendors even though Intel doesn't officially support it.
 Support for 16 PCI Express 3.0 lanes from CPU, 20 PCI Express 3.0 lanes from PCH (LGA 1151), 44 PCI Express 3.0 lanes for Skylake-X
 Support for Thunderbolt 3 (Alpine Ridge)

Other 
 Thermal design power (TDP) up to 95 W (LGA 1151); up to 165 W (LGA 2066)
 14 nm manufacturing process

Configurations 
Skylake processors are produced in five main families: Y, U, H, S, and X. Multiple configurations are available within each family:

List of Skylake processor models

Mainstream desktop processors 

Common features of the mainstream desktop Skylake CPUs:
 DMI 3.0 and PCIe 3.0 interfaces
 Dual channel memory support in the following configurations: DDR3L-1600 1.35 V (32 GB maximum) or DDR4-2133 1.2 V (64 GB maximum). DDR3 is unofficially supported through some motherboard vendors
 16 PCIe 3.0 lanes
 The Core-branded processors support the AVX2 instruction set. The Celeron and Pentium-branded ones support only SSE4.1/4.2
 350 MHz base graphics clock rate

High-end desktop processors (Skylake-X) 
Common features of the high performance Skylake-X CPUs:
 In addition to the AVX2 instruction set, they also support the AVX-512 instructions
 No built-in iGPU (integrated graphics processor)
 Turbo Boost Max Technology 3.0 for up to 2/4 threads workloads for CPUs that have 8 cores and more (7820X, 7900X, 7920X, 7940X, 7960X, 7980XE, and all 9th generation chips)
 A different cache hierarchy (when compared to client Skylake CPUs or previous architectures)

Xeon High-end desktop processors (Skylake-X) 

 Is Xeon instead of Core
 Uses C621 Chipset
 Xeon W-3175X was the only Xeon with a multiplier unlocked for overclocking until the introduction of Sapphire Rapids-WS Xeon CPUs in 2023.

Mobile processors
See also Server, Mobile below for mobile workstation processors.

Workstation processors 
 All models support: MMX, SSE, SSE2, SSE3, SSSE3, SSE4.1, SSE4.2, AVX, AVX2, AVX-512, FMA3, MPX, Enhanced Intel SpeedStep Technology (EIST), Intel 64, XD bit (an NX bit implementation), Intel VT-x, Intel VT-d, Turbo Boost (excluding W-2102 and W-2104), Hyper-threading (excluding W-2102 and W-2104), AES-NI, Intel TSX-NI, Smart Cache.
 PCI Express lanes: 48
 Supports up to 8 DIMMs of DDR4 memory, maximum 512 GB.

Server processors 
E3 series server chips all consist of System Bus 9 GT/s, max. memory bandwidth of 34.1 GB/s dual channel memory. Unlike its predecessor, the Skylake Xeon CPUs require C230 series (C232/C236) or C240 series (C242/C246) chipset to operate, with integrated graphics working only with C236 and C246 chipsets. Mobile counterparts uses CM230 and CM240 series chipsets.

Skylake-SP (14 nm) Scalable Performance
 Xeon Platinum supports up to 8 sockets. Xeon Gold supports up to 4 sockets. Xeon Silver and Bronze support up to 2 sockets.
 −M: 1536 GB RAM per socket instead of 768 GB RAM for non−M SKUs 
 −F: integrated OmniPath fabric 
 −T: High thermal-case and extended reliability
 Support for up to 12 DIMMs of DDR4 memory per CPU socket.
 Xeon Platinum, Gold 61XX, and Gold 5122 have two AVX-512 FMA units per core. Xeon Gold 51XX (except 5122), Silver, and Bronze have a single AVX-512 FMA unit per core.

Xeon Bronze and Silver (dual processor) 
 Xeon Bronze 31XX has no HT or Turbo Boost support.
 Xeon Bronze 31XX supports DDR4-2133 MHz RAM. Xeon Silver 41XX supports DDR4-2400 MHz RAM.
 Xeon Bronze 31XX and Xeon Silver 41XX support two UPI links at 9.6 GT/s.

Xeon Gold (quad processor) 
 Xeon Gold 51XX and F SKUs has two UPIs at 10.4 GT/s. Xeon Gold 61XX has three UPIs at 10.4 GT/s.
 Xeon Gold 51XX support DDR4-2400 MHz RAM (except 5122). Xeon Gold 5122 and 61XX support DDR4-2666 MHz RAM.

Xeon Platinum (octal processor) 
 Xeon Platinum non-F SKUs have three UPIs at 10.4 GT/s. Xeon Platinum F-SKUs have two UPIs at 10.4 GT/s.
 Xeon Platinum supports DDR4-2666 MHz RAM.

See also
 List of Intel CPU microarchitectures

References

External links
 
 

Skylake microarchitecture
Intel microarchitectures
Transactional memory
X86 microarchitectures